Paul Claiborne Park (born October 1, 1954, in North Adams, Massachusetts) is an American science fiction author and fantasy author. He teaches a course in reading and writing science fiction at Williams College.   He has also taught at the Clarion West writing workshop and the Clarion workshop and was an instructor at Clarion West in 2011.

Career
Park appeared on the American science fiction scene in 1987 and quickly established himself as a writer of polished, if often grim, literary science fiction. His first work was the Starbridge Chronicles trilogy, set on a world with generations-long seasons much like Brian Aldiss' Helliconia trilogy. His critically acclaimed novels have since dealt with colonialism on alien worlds (Coelestis), Biblical (Three Marys) and Theosophical (The Gospel of Corax) legends, a parallel world where magic works (A Princess of Roumania and its sequels, The Tourmaline, The White Tyger and The Hidden World), and other topics. He has published short stories in Omni Magazine, Interzone and other magazines, along with anthology series including Postscripts and Exotic Gothic.  In 2010 his short story "The Persistence of Memory, or This Space for Sale" was nominated for a World Fantasy Award; and his novella "Ghosts Doing the Orange Dance" was nominated for a 2010 Nebula Award.

Bibliography

Novels
The Starbridge Chronicles
Soldiers of Paradise. New York: Arbor House, 1987. 
Sugar Rain. New York: Morrow, 1989. 
The Cult of Loving Kindness. New York: Morrow, 1991. 
 Coelestis (vt US Celestis, 1995). London: HarperCollins, 1993, 
 The Gospel of Corax. New York: Soho Press, 1996. 
 Three Marys. Canton, OH: Cosmos Books, 2003. 
 A Princess of Roumania
A Princess of Roumania. New York: Tor, 2005. 
The Tourmaline. New York: Tor, 2006. 
The White Tyger. New York: Tor, 2007. 
The Hidden World. New York: Tor, 2008. 
 All Those Vanished Engines. New York: Tor, 2014. 

As by Paulina Claiborne
 The Rose of Sarifal. Wizards of the Coast, Forgotten Realms, 2012.

Short fiction 
Collections
 If Lions Could Speak, Rockville, MD: Wildside Press, April 2002. 
 Other Stories, Hornsea: PS Publishing, 2015.  
Stories

References

External links

SFsite.com review of If Lions Could Speak and Other Stories
SFsite.com review of A Princess of Roumania
SFsite.com review of The Tourmaline

Interviews
Gevers, Nick (April 2006). "Shadowy Figures, Infinitely Debatable". Infinity Plus.
Johnson, Greg L. (September 2002). "Conversation With Paul Park". SF Site.
Tomio, Jay (April 2005) Starbridge to Roumania". Nekoplz.

1954 births
Living people
20th-century American male writers
20th-century American novelists
20th-century American short story writers
21st-century American male writers
21st-century American novelists
21st-century American short story writers
American fantasy writers
American historical novelists
American male novelists
American male short story writers
American science fiction writers
The Magazine of Fantasy & Science Fiction people
Novelists from Massachusetts
People from North Adams, Massachusetts
Williams College faculty